Ohorongo Cement is a cement factory on farm Sargberg near Otavi in the Otjozondjupa Region of Namibia.

The ground breaking ceremony for the construction of the plant was held in January 2009. A roof wetting celebration took place in February 2010, when the preheater tower reached its final height of 109 meters. Production started in December 2010.

Initially wholly owned by the Schwenk Zement KG, Ohorongo states that ownership is to be transferred to Namibian institutions over time. In 2019 Schwenk still owned 69.83%, with the Development Bank of Namibia the largest minority shareholder. After the 2018 production start of Cheetah Cement, a second, larger, cement factory nearby, Schwenk offered its shareholding for sale. A 2019 acquisition offer by investment company West China Cement, however, was turned down by the Namibian Competition Commission because West China already owns Cheetah Cement.

References

Cement companies of Namibia
Buildings and structures in Otjozondjupa Region
Manufacturing companies established in 2007
2007 establishments in Namibia